Mad, mad, or MAD may refer to:

Geography
 Mad (village), a village in the Dunajská Streda District of Slovakia
 Mád, a village in Hungary
 Adolfo Suárez Madrid–Barajas Airport, by IATA airport code
 Mad River (disambiguation), several rivers

Music

Bands
 Mad (band), a rock band from Buenos Aires, Argentina
 M.A.D (band), a British boyband
 M.A.D. (punk band), a 1980s band, which later became Blast
 Meg and Dia, an American indie rock band

Albums
 Mad (Raven EP), released in 1986
 Mad (Hadouken! EP), released in 2009
 Mad (GOT7 EP), released 2015

Songs
 "Mad" (Ne-Yo song),  2008
 "Mad", by Dave Dudley from Talk of the Town, 1964
 "Mad", from Secret Life of Harpers Bizarre, 1968 
 "Mad", by The Lemonheads from Lick, 1989
 "Mad", from the album Magnetic Man, 2010
 "Mad", by Cassie Steele, 2014
 "M・A・D" (Buck-Tick song), 1991

Organizations
 MAD Studio, an architectural firm
 Mad Computers, defunct American computer company
 Make A Difference, an Indian NGO
 Might and Delight, a Swedish video game development studio
 Militärischer Abschirmdienst, German military counterintelligence agency
 Museum of Arts and Design, New York City, US
 Mechanical Art and Design museum, in Stratford-upon-Avon

Science and technology
 MAD (programming language), for Michigan Algorithm Decoder
 MAD, a protein encoded by the MXD1 gene.
 Magnetic anomaly detector, detects variations in Earth's magnetic field
 Maritime anomaly detection in Global Maritime Situational Awareness, for avoiding maritime collisions
 Mathematicians of the African Diaspora, a website
 Methodical Accelerator Design, a CERN scripting language
 Modified Atkins diet
 Mothers against decapentaplegic, a protein
 MPEG Audio Decoder, software
 Multi-conjugate Adaptive optics Demonstrator, an astronomical instrument
 Multi-wavelength anomalous dispersion, an X-ray crystallography technique
 Mitral annular disjunction, a structural abnormality of the heart

Statistics
 Mean absolute deviation, a measure of the variability of quantitative data
 Median absolute deviation, a statistical measure of variability
 Maximum absolute deviation, a statistical measure of variability
 Mean absolute difference, a measure of statistical dispersion

Television and video
 Mad TV, a 1995–2009 US series
 Mad (TV series), 2010–2013, on Cartoon Network
 MAD TV (Greece), a music channel
 M.A.D. (Indian TV programme), 2005–2010, children's educational programme
 M.A.D., organization in Inspector Gadget
 "M.A.D." (Veronica Mars), a 2005 episode

Other uses
 Mad (magazine), an American humor magazine
 Mad, a term for insanity used chiefly in British English
 Mad, a term for anger used chiefly in US English
 Madagascar, IOC country code
 Mutual assured destruction, nuclear warfare deterrence concept
 Mandibuloacral dysplasia
 Moroccan dirham, the currency of Morocco by ISO 4217 currency code
 mad, the ISO 639-2 code for the Madurese language

See also

 MADD (disambiguation)
 Rabies, (Latin rabies for "madness")
 Mad, a variant of the Hindi-Urdu word for alcohol, madhu
 Madness (disambiguation)
 List of people known as the Mad